Galina Andreyevna Stepanskaya (born 27 January 1949) is a former speed skater who competed for the Soviet Union. She won the 1,500 m event at the 1976 Winter Olympics in Innsbruck. She was Soviet Allround Champion in 1976 and 1977 and won silver twice at the World Allround Championships, in 1977 and 1978. In 2009, she was awarded the Order of the Badge of Honour.

World records
During her career, Stepanskaya set three world records:

Personal records

References

External links
 

1949 births
Living people
Soviet female speed skaters
Olympic speed skaters of the Soviet Union
Olympic gold medalists for the Soviet Union
Speed skaters at the 1976 Winter Olympics
Sportspeople from Saint Petersburg
Olympic medalists in speed skating
World record setters in speed skating
Russian female speed skaters
World Allround Speed Skating Championships medalists

Medalists at the 1976 Winter Olympics